Frankenmuth Township is a civil township of Saginaw County  in the U.S. state of Michigan. The population was 1,895 at the 2020 Census. The city of Frankenmuth is located within the survey township area, but the township and city are administrated autonomously.

Communities
 Gera is an unincorporated community in the township on S. Gera Road (M-83) at the crossing with Huron and Eastern Railway south of Bradley Road and north of King Road. A post office operated from April 23, 1894, until April 30, 1954. It was originally named Frankenmuth Station.

Geography

Demographics

As of the census of 2000, there were 2,049 people, 728 households, and 607 families residing in the township. There were 746 housing units at an average density of 23.0 per square mile (8.9/km2). The racial makeup of the township was 97.76% White, 0.54% African American, 0.10% Native American, 0.20% Asian, 0.29% from other races, and 1.12% from two or more races. Hispanic or Latino of any race were 2.15% of the population.

There were 728 households, out of which 35.6% had children under the age of 18 living with them, 77.3% were married couples living together, 3.7% had a female householder with no husband present, and 16.5% were non-families. 15.0% of all households were made up of individuals, and 8.2% had someone living alone who was 65 years of age or older.  The average household size was 2.79 and the average family size was 3.09.

In the township the population was spread out, with 27.0% under the age of 18, 6.1% from 18 to 24, 23.7% from 25 to 44, 29.3% from 45 to 64, and 13.8% who were 65 years of age or older.  The median age was 41 years. For every 100 females, there were 102.3 males.  For every 100 females age 18 and over, there were 101.8 males.

The median income for a household in the township was $61,480, and the median income for a family was $66,042. Males had a median income of $43,929 versus $31,027 for females. The per capita income for the township was $25,833.  About 2.2% of families and 3.5% of the population were below the poverty line, including 1.8% of those under age 18 and 7.0% of those age 65 or over.

References

Notes

Sources

Townships in Saginaw County, Michigan
Townships in Michigan